Dunning may refer to:

Places
 Dunning, Chicago, Illinois, United States, a community area
 Dunning, Nebraska, United States, a village
 Dunning Creek, Pennsylvania
 Dunning, Perth and Kinross, Scotland, a small village
 Dunning railway station

Other uses
 Dunning (surname), a surname
 Baron Dunning, a title in the peerage of the United Kingdom
 Dunning baronets, a title in the Baronetage of the United Kingdom
 Dunning (process), the process of methodically communicating with customers to ensure the collection of accounts receivable

See also
 Dunning School, a historiographical school of thought regarding the Reconstruction period of American history
 Dunning House, Wawayanda, New York, United States
 Dunning–Kruger effect